Breakfast News was a breakfast news programme which first aired on BBC1 on 2 October 1989. The programme was previously known as Breakfast Time.  It was planned to launch on 18 September 1989 but was held back by two weeks due to technical issues with its new studio. The programme adopted a rolling news format with news summaries every 15 minutes plus weather and regional news every 30 minutes. Other features included a review of the day's newspapers and regular business news updates.

From 22 November 1989, following the commencement of televised coverage of the House of Commons, the 8am to 8.15am part pf the programme was simulcast on BBC2 as part of a new news hour which encompassed a review of the previous day's proceedings at Westminster.

The programme went through three main visual changes. The initial look lasted until 8 April 1993. The 13 April 1993 revamp saw the programme presented from the same set as the One, Six and Nine O'Clock News bulletins. A further and final revamp took place on 2 June 1997 when 'BBC' was shorn from its title, and on-screen it became known as simply Breakfast News. It was during this final period that the tone began to shift, with the return of a sofa set, alongside more features, and more interaction between the presenting team.

The final edition of Breakfast News aired on 15 September 2000 and on 2 October 2000 it relaunched as BBC Breakfast.

BBC Breakfast News only aired from Mondays to Fridays with no weekend editions, although weekend editions were shown during the early stages of the 1991 Gulf War. This compares to their ITV counterparts TV-am and later GMTV who were on the air seven days a week. However, in September 1991 the BBC launched a short 5 minute weekend breakfast news summary. The Saturday edition aired at 7:25am to commence their Saturday schedule. The bulletin was not presented from the Breakfast News set, but from the main BBC News set based in the newsroom.

The Saturday breakfast bulletin was dropped from the schedules in the autumn of 1999 with the last Saturday morning bulletin airing on Saturday 11 September 1999. BBC Two had already been broadcasting an hour of news from BBC News 24, branded as "Weekend 24" on Saturday mornings from 8am to 9am since 31 January 1998, over two months after the launch of BBC News 24 and so the short Saturday breakfast news summary on BBC One started to become redundant. On Sundays the short morning bulletin would air at 9:10am and this would later be incorporated into the Breakfast with Frost programme which launched on 3 January 1993.

Business Breakfast
Business Breakfast was a daily news programme which aired between 6am and 7am, directly preceding Breakfast News between 4 January 1993 and 2000. Initially the programme aired as part of Breakfast News broadcasting between 6:34am and 6:55am. From Tuesday 4 January 2000 until Friday 15 September 2000, Business Breakfast was subsumed into the BBC Breakfast News programme with Breakfast News starting at 6am each weekday. Business Breakfast remained as a feature not a separate programme however, with business news a key feature in the first hour of the programme. This set up was to change from October 2000 with the launch of BBC Breakfast.

Breakfast News Extra
Breakfast News Extra launched on 5 February 1996, as an attempt to compete against Lorraine Kelly on GMTV. The programme was presented from the Breakfast News office, on a blue sofa, and hosted by Juliet Morris. It was short-lived, and was axed in the summer of 1997 with the last one shown on 29 August 1997. By this stage the main BBC Breakfast News had undergone a dramatic visual revamp with a new studio set which included sofas alongside the main presentation desk.

Notable presenters

Nicholas Witchell
Jill Dando
Sally Magnusson
Sara Coburn
Laurie Mayer
Justin Webb
Andrew Harvey
Juliet Morris
Fiona Bruce
Kirsty Wark
Noel Thompson
Michael Peschardt
John Nicolson
Huw Edwards
Sophie Raworth
Tanya Beckett
Jeremy Bowen
Julie Etchingham
Liz MacKean

See also
BBC
TV-am
GMTV

References

External links

BBC television news shows
1989 in British television
1989 British television series debuts
2000 British television series endings
1990s British television series
Breakfast television in the United Kingdom